Naomi Watts is a British actress and producer known for her work in Australian and American film, television and video games. Watts emigrated with her family to Australia from the UK at the age of 14, and made her debut in the 1986 Australian film For Love Alone. She then pursued a brief career in the fashion industry, first as a model and later as a fashion editor. After attending a drama workshop, Watts quit her editing job and pursued acting as a career. She appeared in the sitcom Hey Dad..! (1990), and the soap opera Home and Away (1991). Her first lead role was in the 1993 thriller Gross Misconduct, where Watts played a student who seduces her teacher, and then accuses him of rape.

She transitioned to Hollywood productions in the mid to late 1990s starring in the science fiction film Tank Girl (1995), horror film Children of the Corn IV: The Gathering (1996), and biographical drama Dangerous Beauty (1998). Watts played an aspiring actress in David Lynch's neo-noir film Mulholland Drive (2001), which was her breakthrough role and garnered her international recognition. She then starred as journalist Rachel Keller in the horror remake The Ring (2002), and reprised the role in its sequel The Ring Two (2005). Watts portrayed a grief-stricken mother with a history of substance abuse in the Alejandro González Iñárritu-directed 21 Grams (2003), for which she garnered nominations for Best Actress at the Academy Awards, British Academy Film Awards, and Screen Actors Guild Awards.

Watts played Ann Darrow in Peter Jackson's monster film remake King Kong (2005), for which she won the Saturn Award for Best Actress. She also reprised her role voicing Darrow in the video game adaptation, for which she was nominated for a Spike Video Game Award for Best Performance by a Female. Five years later, she portrayed CIA officer Valerie Plame in the biographical drama Fair Game (2010) with Sean Penn. In 2011, Watts played FBI director J. Edgar Hoover's secretary Helen Gandy in the biographical drama J. Edgar with Leonardo DiCaprio. The following year, she starred as a doctor who is caught up by the aftermath of the 2004 Indian Ocean tsunami with her family in The Impossible (2012). For her performance, Watts received nominations for Best Actress at the Oscars and Golden Globe Awards.

She reteamed with Iñárritu on the 2014 black comedy Birdman. In 2017, Watts starred in the third season of Lynch's television series Twin Peaks and as a psychologist in the psychological thriller series Gypsy which she also executively produced. She played Queen Gertrude and Mechthild in the romantic drama Ophelia (2018). Two years later Watts portrayed Fox News journalist Gretchen Carlson in the miniseries The Loudest Voice (2019).

Film

Television

Video games

See also
 List of awards and nominations received by Naomi Watts

Notes

References

External links
 

Actress filmographies
Australian filmographies
British filmographies